Brice Florentin Dja Djédjé (born 23 December 1990) is an Ivorian professional footballer who plays as a right back or wing back for Turkish club Denizlispor.

He began his career training at the Camp des Loges, the training centre of Paris Saint-Germain. Dja Djédjé's cousin, Franck Dja Djédjé - they grew up as brothers - is also a footballer.

Career

Evian
Born in Aboudé, Ivory Coast, Dja Djédjé started his career with French side Evian and amassed over 100 appearances, scoring six times across four seasons.

Marseille
On 28 January 2014, Dja Djédjé signed a four-and-a-half year deal with Ligue 1 club Olympique de Marseille. After sitting on the bench for some matches early in his Marseille career, Dja Djédjé quickly became a regular starter, displacing Rod Fanni as the club's first-choice right back.

In the 2014–15 season, Dja Djédjé operated as a wing back in several matches as manager Marcelo Bielsa looked for him to provide width and support for Marseille's wide attacks.

On 20 January 2016, he scored his first and only goal for Marseille in the Coupe de France in a 2–0 home win against Montpellier.

Watford
On 21 July 2016, Dja Djédjé joined Premier League side Watford for £3 million on a four-year deal. However, a foot injury meant he was left out of the Hornets' Premier League squad for the first half of the 2016–17 season. He made his debut for Watford in an FA Cup tie with Burton Albion on 7 January 2017. On 22 August 2018, Watford terminated Dja Djédjé's contract by mutual consent.

Ankaragücü
On 17 August 2018, Dja Djédjé joined Süper Lig side Ankaragücü with a two-year deal. He left the club in mid May 2019.

International career
Dja Djédjé made his debut for Ivory Coast on 14 August 2013 in a 4–1 friendly defeat to Mexico. He rejected the chance to appear at the 2015 Africa Cup of Nations, deciding to opt for the guaranteed starting place at Marseille instead of a lesser role with the national team.

Career statistics

Club

International
Source:

References

External links

Living people
1990 births
Ivorian footballers
French footballers
Ivorian expatriates in France
Expatriate footballers in France
Association football defenders
Thonon Evian Grand Genève F.C. players
Olympique de Marseille players
Ligue 1 players
Ligue 2 players
Ivory Coast international footballers
People from Lagunes District
Watford F.C. players
RC Lens players
MKE Ankaragücü footballers
Kayserispor footballers
Samsunspor footballers
Denizlispor footballers
Süper Lig players
Ivorian expatriates in England
Expatriate footballers in England
Ivorian expatriate sportspeople in Turkey
Expatriate footballers in Turkey